Sleeper Cell is an American one-hour drama on the Showtime network that began airing on December 4, 2005. The tagline for the first season was "Friends. Neighbors. Husbands. Terrorists." and the tagline for the second season was "Cities. Suburbs. Airports. Targets." The series was nominated for an Emmy award for Outstanding Miniseries. The eight-episode second season of the series, titled Sleeper Cell: American Terror, premiered on December 10, 2006.  Both seasons of Sleeper Cell were originally aired in an unusual fashion, by filming the entire season ahead of time and then airing the episodes on consecutive nights, such that each brand new season was aired for the first time over a period of less than two weeks. In Australia, both seasons originally aired on the Showtime Australia channel in 2006/2007. Re-runs as of 2008 have screened on the showcase channel (part of the Showtime Australia group of channels).

As extra material on the first season DVDs reveal, the show was originally named The Cell.

Synopsis

Darwyn Al-Sayeed, a 30-year-old American undercover FBI agent who is a Muslim and embracing Islam as his religion, is assigned to infiltrate a terrorist sleeper cell that is planning an attack in Los Angeles. The cell is run by an Arab extremist named Faris al-Farik who disguises himself as a Jew.  The members of the cell come from a variety of racial backgrounds and conflicting personalities.  The series also portrays the hypocrisy and dichotomy of the cell members who claim to be Muslims but engage in behavior that is sinful in Islam (e.g. sex outside marriage) yet they profess a desire to be martyred for Islam.

Darwyn is supervised by FBI senior agent Ray Fuller, also a close friend who worries for Darwyn's safety.

In the second season, Darwyn infiltrates a new cell that has formed to avenge the defeat of the original cell. When his second handler, Patrice Serxner, is killed in Sudan, Darwyn must try to work with yet another handler, Special Agent Russell. Meanwhile, his girlfriend Gayle is drawn deeper into the intrigue when she's caught between Russell, Darwyn and a member of the cell.

The writers once again offered a non-stereotypical mix of cell members, including a white European woman, a Latino-American man and, in a first for American television, a gay Muslim man.

Cast

Season 1

Recurring
 James LeGros—Special Agent Ray Fuller
 Albert Hall—The Librarian
Michael Desante—FBI Special Agent Alim Saleh
 Joshua Feinman—FBI Tech
 Sonya Walger—Special Agent Patrice Serxner
 Megan Ward—Mrs. Fuller
John Fletcher—Deputy Attorney General of the US
 Ally Walker—Lynn Ellen Emerson
Raj Mann—Radical Muslim Man
Luis Chavez—Khashul
 Saïd Taghmaoui—Hamid
Amro Salama-Abbas

Season 2

Recurring
 Jay R. Ferguson—Special Agent Russell
 Michael Rady - Jason
 Susan Pari - Samia
 Sarah Shahi - Farah
 Angela Gots - Carli
 Yvette Nicole Brown - Fatima

Crew

Writers
 Ethan Reiff
 Cyrus Voris
 Angel Dean Lopez
 Alexander Woo
 Kamran Pasha
 Katherine Lingenfelter
 Andrew Barrett
 Nina Fiore (writers' assistant)

Directors
 Ziad Doueiri
 Guy Ferland
 Nick Gomez
 Leon Ichaso
 Leslie Libman
 Vondie Curtis-Hall
 Charles S. Dutton
 Clark Johnson (Pilot Episode)

Sound Department
 Paul Haslinger (Composer)
 Joe Earle (Sound Re-Recording Mixer)
 Elmo Ponsdomenech (Sound Re-Recording Mixer)
 Mark Kamps (Supervising Sound Editor)
 Kevin Roache (Sound Recordist)
 Matt Fausak (Music Editor)

Episodes

Season 1: (2005)
Season one aired from December 4, 2005 to December 18, 2005. The original airdates (U.S.) are listed here for each episode.

Season 2: (2006)
Season two aired from December 10, 2006 to December 17, 2006. There were several cast changes in season two. Thekla Reuten, Omid Abtahi, and Kevin Alejandro joined the main cast as Mina, Salim and Benny, respectively. The original airdates (U.S.) are listed here for each episode.

Home media

Region 1 DVD

Region 2 DVD

Region 4 DVD

References

External links

 
 
 Showcase (Australia) webpage about Sleeper Cell 
 
 
 

Serial drama television series
Showtime (TV network) original programming
Terrorism in television
Television shows set in Los Angeles
2000s American television miniseries
Television series by CBS Studios
2005 American television series debuts
2006 American television series endings
English-language television shows